Asbury Park, New Jersey incorporated as a borough by an act of the New Jersey Legislature on March 26, 1874, from portions of Ocean Township. The borough was reincorporated on February 28, 1893. Asbury Park was incorporated as a city, its current type of government, as of March 25, 1897. The city has seen various changes in its form of government. It had directly elected mayors under its first two forms of government beginning in 1874. In 1915, the city adopted mayor-council form of government with a commission. It reorganized under the 1923 Municipal Manager Law in that year. In 2011, it became mayor-council.

Mayors

References

 
Asbury Park